PKP Class Pt47 is a Polish steam locomotive. An improvement of the successful pre-war PKP class Pt31 class, the main difference is the addition of circular tubes in the fire chamber, thereby significantly increased boiler performance. This class also featured a superheater and many have mechanical stokers to feed coal into the firebox. 180 locomotives were built in total between 1948 and 1951. The designation stood for fast passenger (P) 2-8-2 (t) locomotive designed in 1947.

Although heavy, the Pt47 is powerful and fast. Its main use was to carry heavy fast passenger trains, especially on long distance routes, for example on the difficult route from Cracow to Krynica. They were withdrawn from regular service in 1988. Fifteen survived, mostly in non-working condition.

At first, German tenders from class 41 or 44 locomotives were used, designated 34D44. From 1949, Polish tenders 33D48 were manufactured in Pafawag, next rebuilt to 27D48, when fitted with a mechanical stoker (water capacity 33 m3, then 27 m3).

Nicknames 

 Petucha - after the first two letters of the name

References

 

Railway locomotives introduced in 1948
Pt47
2-8-2 locomotives
Fablok locomotives
Standard gauge locomotives of Poland